Atouguia da Baleia is a parish in the municipality of Peniche, in Portugal. The population in 2011 was 8,954, in an area of 47.02 km². The village of Atouguia da Baleia proper has almost 2,000 residents.

The geology of Atouguia da Baleia is Late Jurassic Lourinhã Fm., where the dinosaur Miragaia longicollum was found.

References

Freguesias of Peniche, Portugal